Peychaud's Bitters is a bitters distributed by the American Sazerac Company. It was originally created between 1849 and 1857 by Antoine Amédée Peychaud, a Creole apothecary from the French colony of Saint-Domingue (now Haiti) who traveled to New Orleans, Louisiana, around 1793. It is a gentian-based bitters, comparable to Angostura bitters, but with a predominant anise aroma combined with a background of mint. Peychaud's Bitters is the definitive component of the Sazerac cocktail.
It is currently produced at the Buffalo Trace Distillery in Frankfort, Kentucky.

References

Further reading 
 Toledano, Roulhac . The National Trust Guide to New Orleans, Page 226. New Orleans, LA: John Wiley & Sons, 1996. .

Bitters
1830 introductions
Sazerac Company brands
1830 establishments in Louisiana
New Orleans cocktails